Morville is a civil parish in Shropshire, England.  It contains 19 listed buildings that are recorded in the National Heritage List for England.  Of these, two are listed at Grade I, the highest of the three grades, one is at Grade II*, the middle grade, and the others are at Grade II, the lowest grade.  The oldest listed building is a church that retains some surviving Norman features.  Also listed are two country houses, together with associated structures.  Otherwise the listed buildings include houses, cottages, farmhouses, farm buildings, a mill, and a signpost, the earliest of which are timber framed.

Key

Buildings

References

Citations

Sources

Lists of buildings and structures in Shropshire